Jozini is an administrative area in the Umkhanyakude District of KwaZulu-Natal in South Africa. Significant portions of Jozini have been neglected in terms of economic development. There is a great disparity between the level of service and infrastructure provision between settlement nodes, such as the towns of Mkuze and Jozini, and the surrounding rural areas. Most of the rural area is associated with a lack of development, poverty and poor service provision.

Main places
The 2001 census divided the municipality into the following main places:

Politics 

The municipal council consists of forty-five members elected by mixed-member proportional representation. Twenty-three councillors are elected by first-past-the-post voting in twenty-three wards, while the remaining twenty-two are chosen from party lists so that the total number of party representatives is proportional to the number of votes received. 

In the election of 1 November 2021 the Inkatha Freedom Party (IFP) won a majority of twenty-four seats.

The following table shows the results of the 2021 election.

References

External links
 Jozini Municipality - Jozini Municipality Home Page

Local municipalities of the Umkhanyakude District Municipality